Hindustan Fertilizer Corporation Limited is a government-owned fertilizer manufacturing company headquartered in New Delhi. It is under the ownership of the Ministry of Chemicals and Fertilizers, Government of India. It mainly manufactures urea which is promoted and distributed by the company under the Moti Urea brand name. It has three manufacturing plants. The Namrup-II unit was closed up by the company in 1994 due to scant supply of natural gas. The corporation was part of the Fertilizer Corporation of India. It was spun off into a separate entity after re-organization of Fertilizer Corporation of India in early 1978 as per Government Of India's decision. It has manufacturing units at Durgapur and Haldia.

Under the Sick Industrial Companies (Special Provisions) Act 1985, the Board for Industrial and Financial Reconstruction (BIFR) declared the Hindustan Fertilizer Corporation Limited sick in 1992. Within the next decade, the Indian government concluded that all of its fertilizer production units were incurring heavy losses, and decided to close the corporation in September 2002.

Revival 
Because of the shortage of domestic production of urea in meeting the overall domestic demand of urea, the cabinet decided in April 2007 to consider the feasibility of reviving the Fertilizer Corporation of India. In 2008, the government approved revival of all the closed units of the Hindustan Fertilizer Corporation.

References

External links 
 Hindustan Fertilizer Corporation Limited

Government-owned companies of India
Fertilizer companies of India
Indian companies established in 1978